These are the official results of the Women's 4 × 100 m Relay event at the 1984 Summer Olympics in Los Angeles, California. A total of 11 teams competed. The final was held on August 11, 1984.

Medalists

Records
These were the standing World and Olympic records (in seconds) prior to the 1984 Summer Olympics.

Final
Held on August 11, 1984

Semi-finals
Held on August 11, 1984

Heat 1

Heat 2

See also
 1982 Women's European Championships 4 × 100 m Relay (Athens)
 1983 Women's World Championships 4 × 100 m Relay (Helsinki)
 1987 Women's World Championships 4 × 100 m Relay (Rome)

References

External links
Official Report
Official Report Volume II  part II, Page 16

R
Relay foot races at the Olympics
1984 in women's athletics
Women's events at the 1984 Summer Olympics